Michael Allen Baker,  (born January 24, 1943) is a Canadian physician, academic, and cancer researcher. He is Rose Family Chair in Medicine, former Physician-in-Chief, University Health Network and Professor of Medicine at the University of Toronto. His research has helped to improve the understanding of human leukemia and other cancers.

Born in Toronto, Ontario, Baker attended Oakwood Collegiate Institute, then received his M.D. from the University of Toronto in 1966. He received his diploma from the National Board of Medical Examiners in 1967 and is a Fellow of the Royal College of Physicians and Surgeons of Canada specializing in Hematology and Internal Medicine. In 1982, he joined the University of Toronto as a Professor of Medicine. In 1992, he was made Physician-in-Chief of the Toronto General Hospital.

He was president of the National Cancer Institute of Canada for 3 years and a board member of the Canadian Cancer Society for 5 years. In 2008, he was appointed by the Ontario Ministry of Health and Long-Term Care Executive Lead - Patient Safety,  to oversee the government's patient safety agenda. In 2011, he was elected Chair of the Board of the Institute of Evaluative Sciences (ICES).

Honours
In 2008, he was made a Member of the Order of Canada "for his contributions to health care in Canada, notably for his work in developing an innovative, integrated medical care program for cancer patients and for his leadership in the area of infectious disease control". In 2009, he was made a member of the Order of Ontario in recognition for being "a leading researcher whose work has led to a better understanding of leukemia and other cancers". In 2006, he was made a Fellow of the Canadian Academy of Health Sciences. He was awarded the 125th Anniversary of the Confederation of Canada Medal and the Queen Elizabeth II Golden Jubilee Medal.

References

1943 births
Living people
Canadian hematologists
Cancer researchers
Members of the Order of Canada
Members of the Order of Ontario
People from Toronto
Physicians from Ontario
University of Toronto alumni
Academic staff of the University of Toronto
Fellows of the Royal College of Physicians and Surgeons of Canada